Archibald Gracie III (December 1, 1832 – December 2, 1864) was a career United States Army officer, businessman, and a graduate of West Point. He is well known for being a Confederate brigadier general during the American Civil War and for his death during the Siege of Petersburg.

Early life
Archibald Gracie III was born on December 1, 1832 to Archibald Gracie II (1795–1865), who married Elizabeth Davidson Bethune (d. 1864).  He was born into a wealthy New York City family with interests in exporting cotton from Mobile, Alabama. After his elementary education, Gracie traveled to Germany for five years of further studying at the University of Heidelberg. After arriving back in the United States Archibald started his education at West Point, at the time of Robert E. Lee's superintendency.  Gracie came to Lee's attention when, after intentionally stepping on fellow cadet Wharton J. Green's heels while marching, he was challenged to a fight on the parade grounds.  When a teacher broke up the fight, which Gracie was losing badly, Green fled, and Gracie refused to tell who he'd been fighting. Days later, Green went into Lee's office to admit his role and demand an equal punishment. Lee decided to punish neither of them, and Gracie and Green became fast friends.

Career
After graduating in 1854, he was appointed a second lieutenant and set off as an escort to Governor Isaac Stevens, who was on the way to the Walla Walla Council of 1855. 

In 1857, Gracie resigned his post to join his father's firm, established during the 1840s in Mobile, Alabama, as agents of the London banking firm of Baring brothers. Later Gracie became the President of the Barings Bank of Mobile. It was here in Mobile that he joined the Washington Light Infantry and became its captain. By the orders of Governor Andrew B. Moore, Archibald and his men took the Mount Vernon Arsenal in Mount Vernon, Alabama.

Civil War service
When Alabama seceded in 1861, Gracie enlisted in the Confederate States Army. In June 1861, he was created a major of the 11th Alabama Regiment. From March to April 1862, he commanded a small company of sharpshooters, who were some of the first to reinforce General Magruder during the Battle of Yorktown.  In July of that year, Gracie was put in command of a brigade near Chattanooga, Tennessee, consisting of the 43rd Alabama Infantry, 55th Georgia Infantry, 12th Georgia Infantry, 1st Georgia Artillery, and 1st Florida Dismounted Regiment. Through his successes in Huntsville, Tennessee, he was promoted to brigadier general on November 4, 1862, at the age of 29.  His company was the guard of the rear of General Bragg's army in Harrodsburg during his retreat from the Battle of Perryville, and during his retreat after the Tullahoma Campaign. General Gracie's command took an active role during the Battle of Chickamauga, where he lost over 700 men.

Gracie and his unit then joined General James Longstreet's army at the Battle of Bean's Station. During this battle, Gracie was shot in the arm, causing temporary paralysis of his little and ring fingers. After his recovery, he was sent to Richmond to join General Beauregard.  While there, he had a horse shot out from under him, but came away relatively unscathed. During the Siege of Petersburg, General Robert E. Lee was at "Gracie's Mortar Hell" inspecting Gracie's defenses. When Lee raised his head over the wall to glance at the Union position, Gracie climbed the wall in front of him. Lee then stated, "Why, Gracie, you will certainly be killed." Gracie replied, "It is better, General, that I be killed than you. When you get down, I will."

Siege of Petersburg

Between July and December 1864, Gracie served in the trenches of Petersburg, Virginia, during the Siege of Petersburg. On December 1, Gracie's 32nd birthday, his second child, a girl, was born, and he was to take a leave to see the baby on December 3. On December 2, however, Archibald Gracie was looking out at the Union lines through his telescope when an artillery shell exploded in front of him, killing him instantly.

Because of his actions at the Battle of Chickamauga, Gracie's name was put into consideration for a promotion to a major general, but his death caused the consideration to be suspended.  Francis "Frank" Orray Ticknor eulogized Gracie's death in the poem "Gracie, of Alabama," which he sent to General Robert H. Chilton.

Personal life
On November 19, 1856, Gracie married Josephine Mayo (1836–1901), daughter of Edward Carrington Mayo (1791–1852) and Adeline Marx (1808–1879).  Josephine was the niece of General Winfield Scott through her father's sister, Maria D. Mayo (1789–1862). Together, the couple had a son and a daughter, who was born the day before Gracie's death. Their children included:

 Archibald Gracie IV (1858–1912), the famous survivor of the Titanic.
 Adeline Gracie (1864–1948)

Gracie is buried in Woodlawn Cemetery in The Bronx, New York City.

Commemorations
New York City's historic Sons of Confederate Veterans Camp, Archibald Gracie Camp #985, is named in his honor.

See also

List of American Civil War generals (Confederate)
Gracie Mansion
Archibald Gracie IV

References
Notes

Sources
Biddle, Ellen McGowan, "Recollections" (1920) pg. 20
Daly, Maria Lydig; Harold Earl Hammond, and Jean V. Berlin, Diary of a Union Lady, 1861-1865 (2000) pg. 33
Eicher, John H., and David J. Eicher, Civil War High Commands. Stanford: Stanford University Press, 2001. .
Owen, Thomas McAdory and Marie Bankhead Owens, History of Alabama and Dictionary of Alabama Biography (1921) pg. 686
Patterson, Gerard A., Rebels from West Point: The 306 U.S. Military Academy Graduates Who Fought for the Confederacy (2002) pg. 126
Sifakis, Stewart. Who Was Who in the Civil War. New York: Facts On File, 1988. .
Smith, Derek, The Gallant Dead: Union and Confederate Generals Killed in the Civil War (2005) pg. 303
Ticknor, Francis Orray and Kate Mason Rowlands, The Poems of Frank O. Ticknor, M.D. (1879) pp. 39–40
Warner, Ezra J. Generals in Gray: Lives of the Confederate Commanders. Baton Rouge: Louisiana State University Press, 1959. .
Welsh, Jack D., Medical Histories of Confederate Generals (1999) pg. 85

1832 births
1864 deaths
Confederate States Army brigadier generals
Northern-born Confederates
United States Military Academy alumni
United States Army officers
American expatriates in Germany
People of Alabama in the American Civil War
Confederate States of America military personnel killed in the American Civil War
Gracie-King family
Burials at Woodlawn Cemetery (Bronx, New York)